town in province is a beach town in the Ciudad de la Habana Province of Cuba. It is a ward (consejo popular) located within the municipality of Habana del Este halfway between the centre of Havana and Santa Cruz del Norte, at the mouth of the Guanabo River, between the Atlantic Ocean coast and the Sierra del Canchón (mountain range).

Overview
Guanabo is a seaside touristic town, with small scale villas and a few low rise hotels.

The town was founded in 1800. In 1827 it was the place where the Peñas Altas uprising was crushed by troops from Havana (Peñas Altas is a neighbourhood east of Guanabo).

External links

Town info (Spanish)

Wards of Havana
Tourist attractions in Havana
Beaches of Cuba
Populated places established in 1800